Marana Mrudanga is a 1992 Indian Kannada-language political drama film directed by B. Ramamurthy and written by Sainath Thotapalli based on the novel Marana Mrudangam by Yandamoori Veerendranath. The film has former Karnataka Chief Minister, Ramakrishna Hegde in a pivotal role. The film also stars Malashri, Sunil, Ananth Nag and Thiagarajan.

The film's music was composed by Hamsalekha and the audio was launched on the Lahari Music banner.

Cast 

Malashri 
Sunil
Ramakrishna Hegde
Ananth Nag
Thiagarajan
Sadashiva Saliyan
Nagesh Kashyap
Sudha Narasimharaju
Agro Chikkanna
Nagesh Mayya
Sundar Raj

Soundtrack 
The music of the film was composed and lyrics written by Hamsalekha.

References

External links
 

1992 films
1990s Kannada-language films
Indian political drama films
Indian crime drama films
1990s political drama films
1990s crime drama films
Films scored by Hamsalekha
Politics in fiction
Films directed by B. Ramamurthy
1992 drama films